Kristian Vilhelm Koren Schjelderup may refer to:

Kristian Vilhelm Koren Schjelderup, Sr. (1853-1913), Norwegian bishop
Kristian Vilhelm Koren Schjelderup, Jr. (1894-1980), Norwegian bishop and son of the former